Winter Story is the first release in the Winter Story album series of South Korean boy band Shinhwa. It was released on 31 December 2003 by Good Entertainment.

Following the success of their Winter Story Tour, Shinhwa has released this album with lead track "Young Gunz".

Track listing
Information is adapted from the liner notes of Winter Story:

Chart performance

Release history

Personnel
Information is adapted from the liner notes of Winter Story:

Album production
 Park Kwon-young - executive producer
 Kim Young-seong - recording engineer, mixing engineer
 Kim Beom-gu - recording engineer
 Seo Seung-hyeon - recording engineer
 Yoon Won-kyeon - recording engineer
 Ko Seung-wook - mixing engineer
 Park Hyeon - mixing engineer
 Jo Joon-seong - mixing engineer
 Choi Hyo-young - mastering engineer
 Hong Joon-ho - guitar
 Kim Tae-hyeon - rhythm programming
 Jo Young-soo - piano
 Seo Young-do - bass

References

Shinhwa albums
2003 compilation albums